Louis de Bourbon, Légitimé de France, Count of Vermandois, born Louis de La Blaume Le Blanc, also known as Louis de/of Vermandois (2 October 1667 – 18 November 1683) was a French nobleman, illegitimate but legitimised son of Louis XIV, King of France by his mistress, Louise de La Vallière. He died exiled and disgraced at the age of 16, unmarried and without issue.

Early life

Louis de La Blaume Le Blanc was born on 2 October 1667 at the Castle of Saint-Germain-en-Laye on 2 October 1667 to Louise de La Blaume Le Blanc de La Vallière, Mademoiselle de La Vallière (1644–1710). His father was his unmarried mother's long-time lover, Louis XIV, King of France (1638–1715). Her parents had been in an extramarital affair for about 6 years by then, but their relationship was nearing its end. They had had 4 children together, only one of whom, the already legitimised Marie-Anne de Bourbon, Mademoiselle de Blois (1666–1739) was still alive when La Blaume Le Blanc was born. He was named after his father.

At the age of 2, in 1669, La Blaume Le Blanc was legitimised, given the surname de Bourbon (of Bourbon), as opposed to the surname de France (of France) bore by his legitimate half-siblings. He was also created Count of Vermandois (comte de Vermandois) and appointed Admiral of France (Amiral de France).

Life with the Orléans family 

In 1674, when Vermandois was 7 years old, his mother entered a Carmelite convent in Paris, and from then on, saw very little of her. He was entrusted to the care of his aunt (the wife of his paternal uncle, Philippe I, Duke of Orléans [1640–1701]), born Princess Elizabeth Charlotte "Liselotte" of the Palatinate (1652–1722), known at court as Madame or Madame Palatine. He lived with the Orléans family in the Palais-Royal in Paris, and became close with his aunt, despite her well-known disdain for the king's "bastards".

The Duke of Orléans was infamous for being effeminate and practicing le vice italien ("the Italian vice"), being homosexual or bisexual. He had children from both of his arranged marriages but had many male (and possibly also some female) lovers before and during them. One of these lovers was Philippe of Lorraine (1643–1702), known as the Chevalier de Lorraine ("Knight of Lorraine"), a man described as having an attractive face and a sharp mind, but also being "insinuating, brutal and devoid of scruple", as well as being "as greedy as a vulture". The young count became involved with the knight and his circle, which included among others François-Louis, Prince of La Roche-sur-Yon (later titular king of Poland and prince of Conti; 1644–1709). He joined a secret group of young aristocrats called La Sainte Congregation des Glorieux Pédérastes ("Holy Congregation of Glorious Pederasts").

When the king learned of his son's involvement with the duke's circles, he exiled the Chevalier de Lorraine and several other members of the "congregation". He reprimanded his son and decided to send him away from the royal court. It was suggested that 15-year-old Vermandois should be married as soon as possible to cover up the scandal, possibly to 6-year-old Louise-Bénédicte de Bourbon, Mademoiselle d'Enghien (1676–1753), the daughter of Henri-Jules, Duke of Enghien (later Prince of Condé; 1643–1709).

Exile and death
In June 1682, Vermandois was exiled to Normandy. Hoping to mend the relationship between father and son, his aunt Madame suggested that he be sent as a soldier to Flanders, then under French occupation. Agreeing with his sister-in-law, the king sent his son to the Siege of Kortrijk, where Vermandois soon fell ill. He was advised by a doctor that he should return to Lille and recover, but, desperate for his father's love, he remained on the battlefield. He died in Flanders on 18 November 1683, and was buried in the Arras Cathedral. His aunt and sister greatly mourned his death, while his father reportedly did not shed a tear. His mother, by then a Carmelite nun under the name of Sœur Louise de la Miséricordie ("Sister Louise of Grace"), was still obsessed with the sin of her affair with the king and said upon hearing the news of his son's death, "I ought to weep for his birth far more than his death".

It was later suggested that he might have been the Man in the Iron Mask, which could not be true as the unidentified prisoner died in 1703.

Ancestry

References

Sources

|-

|-

1667 births
1683 deaths
Illegitimate children of Louis XIV
People from Saint-Germain-en-Laye
17th-century French military personnel
Admirals of France
17th-century French nobility
Counts of Vermandois
French exiles
Man in the Iron Mask
French LGBT people
17th-century LGBT people
LGBT nobility
LGBT military personnel
Sons of kings